Bayrakatuba (Bäyräkätübä) is a rural locality (a village) in Ilchimbetovsky Selsoviet, Tuymazinsky District, Bashkortostan, Russia. The population was 101 as of 2010. There is 1 street.

Geography 
Bayrakatuba is located 16 km northwest of Tuymazy (the district's administrative centre) by road. Ilchimbetovo is the nearest rural locality.

References 

Rural localities in Tuymazinsky District